Alexander "Omar" Kiam (1894 – 1954) was an American fashion designer and costume designer.

Early life
Born Alexander Kiam in Monterrey, Mexico, to Texan parents. Kiam picked up the nickname "Omar" at Riverview Preparatory School in Poughkeepsie, New York. He later went to the Poughkeepsie Military Academy in New York. His first job as a designer was producing caps for babies for a department store in Houston. Kiam chose to retain his nickname professionally, as he appreciated the link to Omar Khayyám.

Costume design

Following a stint in Paris as a student, Kiam returned to the United States and opened his studio in New York City, where he produced work for Broadway theatre. Among the theatre productions he costumed were Dinner at Eight, the Robert E. Sherwood play Reunion in Vienna, and the Edward Sheldon and Margaret Ayer Barnes play Dishonored Lady. In 1933 he moved to Hollywood, where he headed the film costume design departments for Sam Goldwyn Productions and United Artists. Before leaving Hollywood in 1939, Kiam also worked for David O. Selznick and Hal Roach.

One of Kiam's most notable films was the 1937 film A Star is Born, for which he dressed Janet Gaynor. He collaborated with Irene on Algiers.

Filmography
Omar Kiam costumed the following films:

 A Star is Born
 The Adventures of Marco Polo
 Algiers
 Barbary Coast
 Beloved Enemy
 The Call of the Wild
 Cardinal Richelieu
 Come and Get It
 The Cowboy and the Lady
 The Dark Angel
 Dead End
 Dodsworth
 Folies Bergère de Paris
 The Gay Desperado
 The Goldwyn Follies
 The Hurricane
 Kid Millions
 Les Misérables
 The Mighty Barnum
 One Rainy Afternoon
 Pick a Star
 Splendor
 Stella Dallas
 Strike Me Pink
 These Three
 Topper Takes a Trip
 We Live Again
 The Wedding Night
 Woman Chases Man
 Wuthering Heights
 The Young in Heart
 Zenobia

Fashion design
Although primarily known as a costume designer Kiam had also run a wholesale fashion design business supplying clothing to shops across the United States before he moved to Hollywood.

After leaving Hollywood, in 1941 Kiam became head designer for the Ben Reig fashion label, a company founded in 1929. Also designing costume jewelry for them from 1948, he worked there until his death in 1954.

Kiam won the Neiman Marcus Fashion Award in 1941, and in 1946, won the Coty Award jointly with Vincent Monte-Sano and Clare Potter. During the early 1950s Liz Claiborne worked for Kiam.

Kiam died 28 March 1954 at the Ritz Tower Hotel in New York City, after struggling with a sickness that lasted seven months.

See also
List of fashion designers

References

1894 births
1954 deaths
American fashion designers
American costume designers
People from Monterrey
American jewelry designers
American expatriates in Mexico